"Sit Next to Me" is a song by American indie pop band Foster the People. The song is featured as the third track on the band's third studio album Sacred Hearts Club and was released as the record's third single by Columbia Records on July 13, 2017. "Sit Next to Me" (Versions) was recorded on October 13, 2017 and featured a radio edit, acoustic version, and a reworked version of the song. It was then released to US modern rock stations.

Music video
The official video for "Sit Next to Me" was directed by Fourclops and Brinton Bryan and was released on November 10, 2017. The video features 100 posts from Instagram influencers and celebrities and also includes submissions from Foster the People fans all over the world. A cardboard cut-out of Baloony from Phineas and Ferb is seen in one of the Instagram videos. "It was fun to play with the premise of a music video that hijacks your social feed," said director Fourclops in a prepared statement. "Instagram is a major destination for consuming media these days, and it made for an exciting setting for our video. We asked ourselves, what would it look like if all of the accounts within Instagram become transformed by a song?"

Track listing

Personnel
Foster the People
 Mark Foster – lead vocals, bass, synthesizer, guitar, engineer

Additional personnel
 Oliver Goldstein – drum programming, piano, synthesizer, guitar, bass, programming, producer
Josh Abraham – producer
Lars Stalfors – additional production, mixing
Cameron Graham – engineer
Isom Innis – engineer
Dave Cerminara – additional engineering

Charts

Weekly charts

Year-end charts

Certifications

Release history

References

2017 singles
2017 songs
2010s ballads
Foster the People songs
Columbia Records singles
Songs written by Oliver Goldstein
Songs written by Josh Abraham
Songs written by Lars Stalfors
Songs written by Mark Foster (singer)
Torch songs
Electropop ballads